2000 Emperor's Cup Final was the 80th final of the Emperor's Cup competition. The final was played at National Stadium in Tokyo on January 1, 2001. Kashima Antlers won the championship.

Overview
Kashima Antlers won their 2nd title, by defeating Shimizu S-Pulse 3–2 with Mitsuo Ogasawara and Takayuki Suzuki goal.

Match details

See also
2000 Emperor's Cup

References

Emperor's Cup
2000 in Japanese football
Kashima Antlers matches
Shimizu S-Pulse matches